Jules Fisher (born November 12, 1937) is an American lighting designer and producer. He is credited with lighting designs for more than 300 productions over the course of his 50-year career of Broadway and off-Broadway shows, as well extensive work in film, ballet, opera, television, and rock and roll concert tours.  He has been nominated 20 times for Tony Awards (as a lighting designer) and won nine Tony awards for Lighting Design, more than any other lighting designer.

Biography 
Fisher was born in Norristown, Pennsylvania, the son of Anne (Davidson) and Abraham Fisher, a retailer. He is a graduate of Carnegie Institute of Technology. He is married to choreographer-director Graciela Daniele. He has been in a professional partnership with lighting designer Peggy Eisenhauer since 1985, and they formed Third Eye Ltd, a firm specializing in entertainment and theatre lighting. He is also a principal in the theatre consulting firm Fisher Dachs Associates, architectural lighting firm Fisher Marantz Stone, and teaches at The New School.  Fisher was awarded an Honorary Doctorate of Fine Arts degree from Carnegie Mellon University in May 2013.

Stage work (selected)
 Anyone Can Whistle (1964)
 High Spirits (1964)
 The Subject Was Roses (1964)
 Do I Hear a Waltz? (1965)
 You Know I Can't Hear You When the Water's Running (1967)
 The Man in the Glass Booth (1968)
 The Only Game in Town (1968)
 Hair (1968, revival 1977)
 Jesus Christ Superstar (1971)
 Soon (1971)
 Pippin (1972)
 The Iceman Cometh (1973)
 Liza (Special) (1974)
 Chicago (1975)
 Beatlemania (1977)
 La Cage aux Folles (1983)

with Peggy Eisenhauer
 Song and Dance (1985)
 Rags (1986)
 Legs Diamond (1988)
 Ragtime (1998)
 Gypsy (2003)
 School of Rock (2003)
 Assassins (2004)
 The Ritz (2007)
 9 to 5 (2008)
 Lucky Guy (2013)
 Once on this Island (2017)
 Gary: A Sequel to Titus Andronicus (2019)

Concert work
Fisher has worked with many popular musicians on their concerts and tours including:
 The Rolling Stones
 KISS
 David Bowie
 Parliament-Funkadelic
 The Who's Tommy
 Crosby, Stills and Nash
 Whitney Houston
 Simon & Garfunkel
 Barbra Streisand

Film lighting
Fisher has designed theatrical lighting for many film features. Designs include:
 A Star is Born (1976)
 The Rose (1979)
 Can't Stop the Music (1980)
 Chicago (2002)
 The Producers (2005)
 Dreamgirls (2006)
 Enchanted (2007)
 Burlesque (2010)

Fisher can be seen as himself lighting a show in Bob Fosse's All That Jazz (1979).

Tony Award wins 
for Best Lighting Design:
1973 Pippin
1974 Ulysses in Nighttown
1978 Dancin'
1990 Grand Hotel
1991 The Will Rogers Follies
1992 Jelly's Last Jam
1996 Bring in 'da Noise, Bring in 'da Funk (shared with partner Peggy Eisenhauer)
2004 Assassins (shared with partner Peggy Eisenhauer)
2013 Lucky Guy (shared with partner Peggy Eisenhauer)

Tony Award nominations 
for Best Lighting Design:
1972 Jesus Christ Superstar
1976 Chicago
1978 Beatlemania
1978 Dancin' (Best Musical, as producer)
1984 La Cage aux Folles
1986 Song & Dance
1993 Angels in America: Millennium Approaches
1994 Angels in America: Perestroika
1998 Ragtime (shared with partner Peggy Eisenhauer)
2000 Marie Christine and The Wild Party (shared with partner Peggy Eisenhauer)
2018 Once on this Island (shared with partner Peggy Eisenhauer)
2019 Gary: A Sequel to Titus Andronicus (shared with partner Peggy Eisenhauer)

References

External links
 
 
 Jules Fisher and Peggy Eisenhauer papers and designs, 1960-2007, held by the Billy Rose Theatre Division, New York Public Library for the Performing Arts
 Hair Original Broadway production complete lighting paperwork, light plot, hookup, shop order, focus charts, magic sheets and production notes at the New York Public Library Theatrical Lighting Database

1937 births
Living people
People from Norristown, Pennsylvania
American lighting designers
Tony Award winners
Drama Desk Award winners
Carnegie Mellon University College of Fine Arts alumni
Academy of Magical Arts Special Fellowship winners